Edmund Ludwig Robert Paul Theodore Melms was a factory worker, Socialist Party official, and politician in Milwaukee, Wisconsin.

Early life
Melms was born in Greenfield, Wisconsin, in 1874. He dropped out of school in 7th grade, and became a factory worker. About 1897, he joined what was then called the Social-Democratic Party of Wisconsin. In 1902, he became employed by the Party, and would serve the city, county and state parties in various capacities for a quarter-century. He worked as a Party organizer, and wrote for Victor Berger' Milwaukee Leader and Social Democratic Herald.

Public office 
Melms was a Socialist candidate for the Wisconsin State Assembly in 1902. In 1904, he was elected to the Milwaukee Common Council, and would serve as President of that body for eight years. 

From 1915 to 1917, Melms was Sheriff of Milwaukee County, Wisconsin.  In 1918, he was an unsuccessful candidate for the Wisconsin State Senate. Also in 1918, Melms was a candidate for the United States House of Representatives from Wisconsin's 4th congressional district, losing to John C. Kleczka. He ran for the seat again in 1922 and 1926, losing both times to John C. Schafer.

He died on January 6, 1933, in Milwaukee and is buried at Forest Home Cemetery there.

References

People from Greenfield, Wisconsin
Wisconsin sheriffs
Socialist Party of America politicians from Wisconsin
Wisconsin city council members
1933 deaths
People from Milwaukee